Madiran is a commune in the Hautes-Pyrénées department in south-western France.

It is the centre of a wine-producing area.

Madiran wine

Wine is produced around Madiran under three Appellations d'Origine Contrôlées (AOCs): Madiran for powerful red wines primarily from the grape variety Tannat, Pacherenc du Vic-Bilh for sweet white wines and Pacherenc du Vic-Bilh Sec for dry white wines primarily from the grape varieties Courbu and Petit Manseng.

See also
French wine
Communes of the Hautes-Pyrénées department

References

Wine regions of France
Communes of Hautes-Pyrénées